Skateboard Smack-ups were a controversial series of plastic figures on skateboards produced in 1986 by Playtime Products, a company which was later acquired by Tyco Toys in 1991. In the vein of Garbage Pail Kids and other '80s gross out humor, the 12 figures depicted children on skateboards being violently maimed by everyday skateboarding obstacles. For example, one figure named "Tammy Tailpipe" is impaled through the face by a car's tailpipe. The violence depicted in the figures led to their being banned by mothers and Parent-Teacher Associations and even banned within Australia by the Australian Competition & Consumer Commission on December 13, 1990.

Figures
 Ronnie Road Kill
 Patty Plate Glass
 Tammy Tailpipe
 Wally Wall Banger
 Sammy Stop Sign
 Amy Asphalt
 Lois Low Branch
 Betty Bumpers
 Rich Stitched
 Timmy Tire Track
 Tony Traffic Cone
 Carrie Car Door

See also
 Garbage Pail Kids
 Savage Mondo Blitzers
 Gross out

References

Products introduced in 1986
Skateboarding
1980s toys